Marin Voinea (11 September 1935 – 19 April 2021) was a Romanian footballer who played as a forward. His nephew, Marcel Răducanu was also a footballer.

International career
Marin Voinea played three games at international level for Romania, scoring two goals in his debut, a friendly which ended with a 4–0 victory against Morocco. He also played in a 6–0 loss against Spain at the 1964 European Nations' Cup qualifiers.

Honours
Siderurgistul Galați
Divizia B: 1964–65

Notes

References

External links
Marin Voinea at Labtof.ro

1935 births
2021 deaths
Romanian footballers
Romania international footballers
Association football forwards
Liga I players
Liga II players
FC Progresul București players
Faur București players
People from Vâlcea County